Since the inception of the A-League Men, Australian association football's highest level annual men's league tournament, 30 football stadiums have been used to host matches, with one more stadium set to host their first A-League matches in the 2018-19 season. The inaugural round of A-League matches took place on 26 and 28 August 2005, with four clubs hosting the opening fixtures.

Of the stadiums currently serving as a team's regular home stadium, Sydney FC's Allianz Stadium is the largest stadium in the league (42,500), whilst Western United's Eureka Stadium is the smallest (11,000). The largest capacity stadium ever used in the A-League Men was Stadium Australia (83,500), which served as the temporary home ground of the Western Sydney Wanderers from 2016-2019 while the Western Sydney Stadium was being constructed. The smallest capacity stadium ever used in the A-League Men was the Morshead Park Stadium (8,500), which hosted an A-League Men's match between Western United and Wellington Phoenix on 9 April 2022. AAMI Park is the only stadium to currently serve as the home ground of multiple teams, with the stadium serving as the home ground of Melbourne City, Melbourne Victory and Western United.

Current home stadiums

Future and proposed home stadiums

Temporary and former stadiums

Notes

See also

List of A-League Women stadiums

References

External links

Stadiums
Lists of sports venues in Australia